Chizhou is a prefecture-level city in the south of Anhui province, China. It borders Anqing to the northwest, Tongling and Wuhu to the northeast, Xuancheng to the east, Huangshan to the southeast, and the province of Jiangxi to the southwest. Its population was 1,342,764 as of the 2020 census whom 615,274 lived in the built-up (or metro) area made of Guichi District.
Mount Jiuhua (Jǐuhuáshān), located in Qingyang county, is one of the four sacred mountains of Chinese buddhism.

In May 1949, the Chizhou Special Administrative Region was established under the jurisdiction of the people's Administrative Office of Southern Anhui and the Chizhou Special Administrative Office in Guichi county.

From February 1952 to May 1965, Chizhou Special Area was abolished, and the counties under its jurisdiction were divided into Anqing Special Area, Huizhou Special Area and Wuhu Special Area respectively.

From May 1965 to January 1980, the Chizhou special zone was set up, directly under Anhui province.

From January 1980 to August 1988, Chizhou Special Area was abolished and counties under its jurisdiction were incorporated into Anqing Special Area, Xuancheng Special Area and Huizhou Special Area.

In August 1988, the Chizhou area was relocated to Anhui province.

On 26 June 2000, Guichi District, Dongzhi County, Qingyang County, Shitai County, Jiuhua Mountain Scenic Area and Chizhou Economic and Technological Development Zone were withdrawn and built.

Administration

The prefecture-level city of Chizhou administers four county-level divisions, including one district and three counties.

Guichi District
Dongzhi County
Shitai County
Qingyang County

Climate

Transport
Chizhou is served by Chizhou railway station on the Nanjing–Anqing intercity railway and the Tongling–Jiujiang railway. Chizhou Jiuhuashan Airport was opened in August 2013, serving Tongling and Mount Jiuhua.

References

External links
Government website of Chizhou (in Simplified Chinese)

 
Cities in Anhui
National Forest Cities in China
Populated places on the Yangtze River